Francisco José Beltrán Peinado (born 3 February 1999) is a Spanish professional footballer who plays as a central midfielder for La Liga club RC Celta de Vigo.

Club career

Rayo Vallecano
Born in Madrid, Beltrán joined Rayo Vallecano's youth system in 2013 from Getafe CF. He made his senior debut with the former's reserves on 13 December 2015 at the age of just 16, starting in a 1–1 Tercera División home draw against CD San Fernando de Henares.

Beltrán was a regular for the first team during the 2016 pre-season, being the most utilised player by manager José Ramón Sandoval. He made his professional debut on 20 August, playing the full 90 minutes in a 2–1 away loss to Elche CF in the Segunda División.

Beltrán scored his first goal as a professional on 29 October 2016, his team's first in a 3–2 defeat at CD Tenerife. An undisputed starter during the 2017–18 season, he contributed 40 appearances as his side returned to La Liga as champions.

Celta
On 1 August 2018, Beltrán signed a five-year contract with top-flight club RC Celta de Vigo, for a reported fee of € 8 million. He played his first league match on 18 August, starting in a 1–1 home draw with RCD Espanyol, and on 7 January 2019 he scored his first such goal to equalise in a 2–1 loss to Athletic Bilbao also at Balaídos.

Beltrán was sent off in the 25th minute of a 0–2 home loss against Granada CF on 15 September 2019 for a foul on Yangel Herrera that was confirmed by video assistant referee review; teammate Jorge Sáenz had already been ejected through the same technology.

International career
Due to the isolation of some national team players following the positive COVID-19 test of Sergio Busquets, Spain's under-21 squad  were called up for the international friendly against Lithuania on 8 June 2021. Beltrán made his senior debut in that match, a 4–0 victory in Leganés.

Career statistics

Club

International

Honours
Rayo Vallecano
Segunda División: 2017–18

References

External links

1999 births
Living people
Footballers from Madrid
Spanish footballers
Association football midfielders
La Liga players
Segunda División players
Tercera División players
Rayo Vallecano B players
Rayo Vallecano players
RC Celta de Vigo players
Spain youth international footballers
Spain under-21 international footballers
Spain international footballers